Violet Keene (1893–1987) was an English-born Canadian photographer.

Personal life
In 1893, Violet Keene was born in Bath, Somerset, England to the photographer Minna Keene.  The family later moved to Canada, residing in Montreal and then Toronto.  Keene married Harold Edgar Perinchief, but kept her maiden name.  She died in Oakville, Ontario on 10 May 1987.

Career
Keene first learned photography in her mother's Montreal studio.  She exhibited her work in both Europe and North America.  In Toronto, she established her own studio where she photographed Canadian artists and statesmen such as Aldous Huxley, George Bernard Shaw, and Vere Ponsonby, 9th Earl of Bessborough.

References

External links
 

1893 births
1987 deaths
20th-century Canadian photographers
20th-century Canadian women artists
20th-century women photographers
Canadian women photographers
British emigrants to Canada
people from Bath, Somerset